The digital changeover is the name given to the process by which analogue television in New Zealand was replaced with digital terrestrial television. It is sometimes referred to as the "analogue switch off".

In New Zealand, the switch off of analogue signals started in September 2012, with the digital switchover being completed in Hawke's Bay in the North island and the West Coast region of the South Island. The country's switch to digital terrestrial reception was completed on 1 December 2013 when analogue transmissions were switched off in the upper North Island.

During 2011–12, the digital terrestrial television network was extended to cover some six-sevenths of the country's people. The Ministry for Culture and Heritage's "Going Digital" group set up an assistance scheme for the first two regions which would complete the changeover, Hawke's Bay in the North island and the West Coast region of the South Island. Similar schemes were run in each region as its changeover date approached.

Switchover dates
These are the dates at which switchover took place in each region of New Zealand.

Note that area boundaries are based on transmitters - it is possible for someone on the fringe areas of a changeover region to pick up an analogue signal from another transmitter outside the region. For example. Blenheim and parts of Marlborough can pick up analogue television from Wellington's Mount Kaukau transmitter (this ability was most notably demonstrated during the 1968 Wahine disaster, where due to an extratropical cyclone cancelling flights and the then lack of an inter-island network, news footage was relayed to the South Island by filming a Blenheim television tuned to Wellington then rushing the film to Christchurch by road to be broadcast.)

See also
Freeview (New Zealand)
Digital television transition
Digital switchover dates in the United Kingdom

References

Television in New Zealand
Digital television
2012 in New Zealand television
2013 in New Zealand television